The Colorado State League was an unaffiliated minor league baseball league that played between 1885 and 1898 involving teams from Colorado.

Cities represented 
 Aspen, CO: Aspen Silver Kings 1889; Aspen Miners 1896, 1898-1899 
 Colorado Springs, CO: Colorado Springs 1889, 1896 
 Denver, CO: Denver Solis 1889; Denver Gulfs 1896, 1898 
 Fort Collins, CO: Fort Collins Farmers 1898 
 Gillett, CO: Gillett 1896 
 Glenwood Springs, CO: Glenwood Springs Bathers 1898 
 Leadville, CO: Leadville Blues 1889, 1898-1899 Leadville Angels 1896
 Louisville, CO: Louisville Coal Miners 1898 
 Pueblo, CO: Pueblo Ponies 1889; Pueblo Rovers 1896, 1898-1899

Standings & statistics
1889 Colorado State League President: Henry S. Woodruff
 

1898 Colorado State League President: A. Magnam

Player statistics

References

External links
Baseball reference

Defunct minor baseball leagues in the United States
Baseball leagues in Colorado
Sports leagues established in 1889
Sports leagues disestablished in 1898